Melica minuta is a species of grass that can be found in the Mediterranean Basin, from Portugal and Morocco to the Eastern Mediterranean.

Description
Both the leaf-sheaths and the leaf-blades have glabrous surface. They carry 7–30 fertile spikelets.

They also have 2 fertile florets which are diminished at the apex. The sterile florets are also present in a number of 2-3, and are barren, cuneate, and clumped. Both the upper and lower glumes are keelless, membranous, oblong and have acute apexes.

Its lemma have scaberulous surface with the fertile lemma being chartaceous, keelless, oblong, ovate and of the same size as the upper glume. Lemma have an acute apex, with palea being 2-veined. Flowers are fleshy, oblong and truncate. They also grow together, have 2 lodicules and 3 anthers.

References

External links
Image of Melica minuta

minuta
Flora of Europe
Flora of North Africa
Flora of Western Asia
Taxa named by Carl Linnaeus